Radha Stirling is a human rights advocate, and lawyer, specializing in legal issues in the Middle East. She is the founder of the United Kingdom-based organisations Detained in Dubai, Due Process International and IPEX (Interpol & Extradition) Reform.

She founded Detained in Dubai, a justice organisation. in 2008 after her friend, Cat Le-Huy, was imprisoned in Dubai. Stirling campaigned for his release, and subsequently received requests from other people in need of help, so thought there was a need for an organisation to assist victims of injustice.

Stirling also campaigns for changes to the legal system of the United Arab Emirates (UAE) and founded Due Process International to campaign for reforms in the wider Middle East. Stirling has worked closely with Senators and Ministers of Parliament; her work with the Australian Parliament ensured provisions to safeguard citizens against human rights violations were included in their extradition treaty with the UAE.

In March 2018, Stirling acted for Hervé Jaubert and Sheikha Latifa Bin Rashid Al Maktoum, after she made allegations of abuse and torture against her father, Mohammed bin Rashid Al Maktoum, the ruler of Dubai. Indian and UAE soldiers captured the two as they were in the Arabian Sea, near the coast of India.

Early life
Stirling attended Mater Christi College, in  Belgrave, Victoria; Yarra Valley Anglican School; Box Hill TAFE and Bond University.

Career
Stirling became active in the Middle East when Cat Le-Huy, a friend, was detained in Dubai. She led a campaign for his release in 2008, founding Detained in Dubai.

She was associated with Dubai and Cairo-based law firm Nasser Hashem and Partners, but left the firm after five years.  Stirling founded a campaign group, IPEX Reform, specialising in extradition and Interpol cases and is an advocate for policy reform to prevent abuse of Interpol.  Stirling has provided expert witness testimony in UAE and Qatar extradition cases and civil litigation suits.

in 2017, Stirling and barrister Ben Cooper of Doughty Street Chambers urged the British Irish Commercial Bar Association (BICBA) to cancel an upcoming conference with the Dubai International Arbitration Centre (DIAC) following allegations of corruption and malpractice. BICBA later cancelled their event.

In 2021, Stirling helped the family of Billy Hood, a British football coach detained in the UAE  and in 2022, supported Brian Glendinning, who was detained in Iraq over a Qatar-issued Interpol Red Notice for a bank debt.

Lobbying 
Stirling has worked alongside a number of political figures representing her clients and causes.  In 2010, Senator Kroger and Stirling successfully lobbied Australian parliament to install human rights safety provisions into the newly passed extradition treaty between Australia and the UAE.

Stirling has worked with a number of British politicians including Priti Patel who advocated for Asa Hutchinson to be freed by the UAE, Kenny MacAskill for Conor Howard, Emma Lewell-Buck who raised the case of Robert Urwin in Parliament, Crispin Blunt who supported Christopher Emms and Canadian MP Richard Martel and Foreign Affairs Minister Pamela Goldsmith-Jones to successfully resolve 86 criminal cases against André Gauthier in the Gold AE scandal. Prime Minister Justin Trudeau responded to calls by Martel, before his release from jail in Dubai.  Stirling has worked with Lord Timothy Clement-Jones, Baroness Janet Whitaker and Andy Slaughter, MP to call on the Foreign Office to increase their travel warnings and even sanction the UAE over the abuse of Brits in detention. In 2022, she worked with Douglas Chapman, MP to secure the freedom of Scotsman Brian Glendinning.

Interpol and Extradition Reform 
Stirling founded IPEX Reform, an NGO campaigning for reform of extradition laws and the red notice system.

Stirling has criticised the United States. Australia, Qatar and the United Arab Emirates for abusing the Interpol red notice system or failing to protect their citizens from the abuse.

Criticism of the British Foreign Office 
Stirling has called for increase travel warnings, saying "no-one would really be aware" of the severity of cyber-crime laws in the UAE, and the "FCO had failed to adequately warn tourists about them."  Over Billy Hood's detention, she said “These are not isolated incidents but repeat patterns and this is why Baroness Whitaker, Andy Slaughter and other MP’s have called on the foreign office to increase their travel warnings and even sanction the UAE over the abuse of Brits in detention."

Stirling accused the Foreign Commonwealth and Development Office of “working too strongly in cooperation with the UAE Government”. She criticised the FCO for providing advice to British travellers which “really falls short of the reality of the situation”.  Stirling also worked with Billy Barclay, who said "that the embassy was advising the family against campaigning for his release. “In fact, it was only as a result of the campaign…that he is home today."

Media appearances 
Stirling has appeared in a number of documentaries and TV shows. She has appeared on Good Morning Britain, 60 Minutes, ITV's DayBreak, BBC's The Missing Princess, an Aljazeera documentary with Tamer Almisshal, and the Sean Hannity show.

Client advocacy 
Stirling has published articles and videos extensively on social media social media laws, cybercrime laws and Interpol Red Notice abuse. She has publicly campaigned for the release of people detained in the UAE, notably Jamie Harron, Ellie Holman, Billy Barclay, Johnson George, Richard Lau, Matthew Hedges, Matt Joyce and Marcus Lee, Safi Qurashi, Scott Richards, Conrad Clitheroe, Gary Cooper, Farzan Athari, Laleh Shahravesh, Conor Howard and Albert Douglas.

Sheikha Latifa Al Maktoum 
Sheikha Latifa bin al Maktoum, daughter of the ruler of Dubai, instructed Stirling's assistance during her attempted escape.  Toby Cadman of Guernica International Justice Chambers brought the princess's case to the United Nations, following her reported abduction from US flagged yacht Nostromo in March 2018.  Stirling provided testimony before the United Nations Working Group on Enforced and Involuntary Disappearances and has worked closely with Human Rights Watch and Amnesty International to seek Sheikha Latifa's freedom.  Stirling was featured on 60 Minutes and BBC documentary “Escape from Dubai” which showcased Latifa's escape and subsequent abduction by UAE and Indian military forces.

Public speaking and work with think tanks 
Stirling spoke at a Frontiers of Freedom conference in Washington DC, in November 2018, on a dais with speakers that included Senator Rand Paul. She presented information on a variety of Middle East issues, including reports of increased aggression and lawlessness on the part of America's gulf allies. She suggested that relationships and policies needed to be reviewed in order to ensure security and safety for the United States and its Western allies.

She presented at the OffshoreAlert conference in Miami on the risks of doing business in the Gulf.

Journalism

She hosts her own blog and is an author for the Jerusalem Report, the Times of Israel, the Independent and Inside Arabia. and has written a book on lawyers in Dubai.  She covers topics ranging from rape victims being charged with sex outside marriage, sanctions violations, the execution of Khashoggi, the Abraham Accords and worldwide ambivalence to Ukraine.

Ras Al Khaimah and Hacking

Stirling has focussed on the Emirate of Ras Al Khaimah (RAK) and ruler Sheikh Saud bin Saqr Al Qasimi.  Stirling criticized the ruler and alleged "massive corruption" leading to she and her clients being targeted by Israeli hackers.

Stirling lobbied against international law firm Dechert lawyers, supporting her Ras Al Khaimah clients in their torture allegations against the firm. Dechert partner Neil Gerrard resigned as partner and is now subject to a £1 million claim for hacking.

A Citizen Lab and Facebook investigation found her clients were targeted by Israeli spy company, Bluehawk CI.  Stirling suggested America should hold foreign states and corporations to account.” 

In a separate incident, a fake philanthropist reached out to Radha Stirling which the Daily Beast found to be "a crude attempt to hack the attorney’s phone, that shows the lengths that some are apparently willing to go to seek information about lawsuits against Ras Al Khaimah."  The hackers were seeking information on her RAK clients and litigations she was involved with as well as the Jordanian Princess Haya.  They then tried to send her malware to surveil her phone

Latifa bint Mohammed Al Maktoum
In December 2018, Helene Jaubert, the American ex-wife of former French Navy officer Hervé Jaubert told American news website The Daily Beast that Hervé Jaubert and Stirling had been in contact with princess Latifa bint Mohammed Al Maktoum (II) for 5 years and invented the whole disappearance scheme together. According to Helene, “The whole plan was for Herve to help her escape and once he got her out the daughter was going to get to the dad and say I want $3 million or else I’ll tell all to the media”. According to Helene, "It was a con. It’s a corrupt scheme gone haywire".  Herve Jaubert responded “Radha Sterling could not have planned anything because she knew about Latifa escape only from March 2, 2018.”

According to Stirling, Latifa phoned her from the boat in the middle of the ambush, saying she feared for her life and “was hearing gunshots.” According to Stirling, Latifa made the call via WhatsApp and evidence of the call was provided to authorities in the US and UK and made available to reporters, although The Daily Beast pointed out that a satellite phone is normally needed to call from their alleged location in the Indian Ocean.

Alcohol in Dubai
In August 2018, Stirling stated that "the UAE maintains a deliberately misleading facade that alcohol consumption is perfectly legal for visitors" after Swedish-Iranian national Ellie Holman, whom she assisted, was reportedly arrested for drinking one complimentary glass of wine aboard an Emirates flight from London to Dubai. She said “They will offer you alcohol on their airline, and arrest you at the airport for accepting it. This can only be regarded as such a deliberate attempt to misrepresent UAE rules on alcohol that it amounts to entrapment."

References

External links
 

Living people
1978 births
Bond University alumni
Women human rights activists
British human rights activists
20th-century British people
Political consultants